Silver Islet refers to both a small rocky island and a small community located at the tip of the Sibley Peninsula in northwestern Ontario, Canada.

A rich vein of pure silver was discovered on this small island in 1868 by the Montreal Mining Company. At that time, the island was approximately [50 m²] in size and only 2.5 metres above the waters of Lake Superior. In 1870, the site was developed by Alexander H. Sibley's Silver Islet Mining Company which built wooden breakwaters around the island to hold back the lake's waves and increased the island's area substantially with crushed rock. The islet was expanded to over 10 times its original size and a small mining town was built up on the shore nearby.

After most of the purest ore from the original site had been removed, a second vein was discovered in 1878. By 1883, most of the highest quality silver had been extracted and the price of silver had declined. The final straw came when a shipment of coal did not arrive before the end of the shipping season. The pumps holding back the waters of the lake stopped and in early 1884 the islet's mine shafts, which had reached a depth of 384 metres, were flooded.  They would never be de-watered, and the mine's underground operations would never be reopened.

Over the 16 years that the mine was in operation, $3.25 million worth of silver was extracted.

The houses originally built to house miners are now used as private summer cottages. The general store has been restored, and serves light meals in its tea-room, in addition to selling a variety of knickknacks and basic foodstuffs.

As recounted in an article written by Syd Hancock on January 21, 1972 on the occasion of Julian Cross's death, Silver Islet is the home of Julian (Jules) Cross, founder of Steep Rock Iron Mine in Atikokan, Ontario. Outside the Atikokan Library & museum is a bronze plaque erected by the Ontario Department of Public Records and Archives to mark the historical significance of the Steep Rock Iron Range. On December 29, 1971, the man who unveiled this plaque, and made possible the Steep Rock story, Julian Gifford Cross, died at the age of 83. Born at Silver Islet on July 25, 1888, only four years after the closing of that historic silver mine, his destiny and the future of many others was inevitably associated with mining.

Sleeping Giant Provincial Park has an excellent exhibit in its visitor centre, detailing the structure and history of the mine.

There is speculation that much silver remains to be recovered at this location, but attempts to reopen the mine in 1919 and the 1970s (reprocessing mine tailings) were not successful.

The Silver Islet Mine was also where "Vanners" were first used commercially to extract metal from low-grade ore.  Known as the "Frue Vanner" as it was named for W. B. Frue, Superintendent of the Silver Islet Mine, who developed the system, it was first installed at the "Stamp Mill" beside "Frue's Brook" on the mainland.  Modern versions of the Frue Vanner are still in use today.

In popular culture

Silver Islet, specifically the missing coal shipment in 1883, is the subject of the Tanglefoot song "One More Night".

Silver Islet is featured as the hometown of Sarah, a waitress, in Jane Urquhart's novel The Underpainter.

A miner's perspective is the subject of the song "Silver Islet" by Canadian band Poor Angus, on their "Gathering" album.

Silver Islet is featured in the song "My Hometown" by Burnz n Hell. The song is a tribute to Thunder Bay uploaded to Youtube.com in 2008.

Silver Islet and its history are mentioned in the novel "The Lightkeepers Daughters" by Jean E. Pendziwol.

Bibliography

 Barr, Elinor, 1933-. Silver Islet : striking it rich in Lake Superior. Toronto : Natural Heritage/Natural History, c1988.
 Excavating for a mine : Silver Islet, 1868-2008 : 140th anniversary / edited by Bill MacDonald. Thunder Bay, Ont. : Porphyry Press, [2008].
 Macfarlane, Thomas, 1834-1907. Silver Islet. Montreal : Dawson Bros., 1880.

See also 
 Sleeping Giant

References

External links

Ontario Plaques - Silver Islet
Photos of Silver Islet and the Sibley Peninsula.

Ghost towns in Ontario
Communities in Thunder Bay District
Islands of Lake Superior in Ontario